The RMC Paladins are the athletic teams that represent Royal Military College of Canada in Kingston, Ontario, Canada. Its facilities include the Kingston Military Community Sport Centre (KMCSC) with seating for 3737, the Navy Bay fields with seating for 800 and Constantine Arena with seating for 1500 and the Birchall Pavilion.

Sports 
The Paladins currently compete in five sports in the Ontario University Athletics Association (OUA):
Fencing (M/W)
Hockey (M)
Rugby union (M)
Soccer (M/W)
Volleyball (M/W)

Facilities
<div style="">

RMC coaching

The Director of Athletics, Darren Cates, oversees Physical Education, Recreation, Intramurals and the varsity program and has 26 full-time employees. "At a civilian university you must justify why physical activity is important. Here you don't have to do that," said Cates. "At RMC it is accepted that physical activity and sports are valuable and needed. We're held in the same regard as academics and second language training."

Although the RMC does not give out Athletic Financial Awards (AFAs), students have a subsidized education through the Canadian Forces. Unlike many civilian universities, the RMC only employs full-time coaches who can spend all of their time focusing on their teams and their recruiting efforts.

RMC student-athlete prospects
Prospective student-athletes at RMC should meet at least seven of the 10 criteria:
 plays RMC sport at an "elite" level during his or her high school years;
 history of being a responsible person;
 potentially motivated towards RMC and Canadian Forces;
 history of being involved in community, school or church activities (2 out of 3);
 demonstrated good work ethic in full-time or part-time volunteer positions;
 dynamic and steadfast;
 thrives on challenges;
 potentially academically solid;
 excellent time-management skills; and
 has what it takes to be a potential "leader".

History

This photo of Royal Military College of Canada cadets doing a gymnastics routine, taken in 1901 in Kingston, is part of the Canada Patent and Copyright Office collection. The cadets are performing human pyramids, where the students work on balance, strength, cooperation, and teamwork. In this stunt, participants form pyramids of layers of persons, each standing on two others one level lower, one half a position to the right and the other to the left.

In 1931–32, Brigadier WHP Elkins, RMC Commandant, introduced an academic eligibility rule for participation on the hockey and football teams which barred cadets with academic averages below 40%. He subsequently reported an improvement in the quality of the classwork and another successful year in intercollegiate competition.

Redmen to Paladins 

Once RMC re-opened after World War II, varsity athletes representing RMC were proud to call themselves the Redmen in competition. It represented one of the most prevalent facets of RMC tradition, the wearing of the scarlet uniform on formal parades. Gentlemen cadets first took on the name because it was an all-male institution at the time and due to the red uniform, hence red-men, informally "Reddies". In 1996, women had been studying as RMC cadets for sixteen years so college authorities thought it was necessary to change the varsity title to something that was representative of the whole cadet wing. Furthermore, the college was receiving some criticism that Redmen was a derogatory name for Canada's Aboriginal People.

With the closure of Royal Roads Military College (RRMC) and College militaire royal de St-Jean (CMR) in 1995, RMC saw two more student bodies join the college. Because of a large induction of francophone students from CMR, RMC was transformed into a bilingual university. General Charles Emond, the commandant at the time, decided that the Redmen was not a fit name for this bilingual and coeducational institution. Therefore, he invited the officer cadets to choose a new name.

Gen Emond set out very specific criteria for the Redmen's replacement. He decreed that the new name had to be representative of the profession of arms; it had to be identified in two languages; it also had to be unisex and original. Furthermore, the name needed to be representative of a person, people or animal rather than an inanimate object. The logo associated with the name had to be simple and easily identifiable for the public. The new name should also be easily incorporated into college chants and songs.

Various committees, composed of cadets and staff, came up with twenty-four new names for the varsity teams, such as the Cavaliers or the Red's, the two most popular names were the Sabers and the Paladins. There was vote cast by the staff and students to decide on which of the three top choices would be the one. A committee of twenty-four people was established to advertise each of the proposed names. The committee held an electoral campaign of sorts where each name was given a logo and mascot to better relate to the college on what they were voting for.

The whole process of finally choosing a name took two years to complete and as a result, the college was without a sports name for the 1996–97 season. In 1997, the Director of Cadets, Lieutenant Colonel (LCol) Michaud released the new name. All RMC representative sports teams would now be called the Paladins. The name Paladins had won by a landslide of 70% of the votes, it was also the only name that met the criteria demanded by Gen Emond.

Since 1997, athletes of the Royal Military College of Canada have been known as the Paladins. Paladins were knights of the Crusades who modeled themselves as honest, courageous, loyal and chivalrous knights who prided themselves on their skill in battle.

In 2002, Rear-Admiral David Morse, the commandant at the time, decided to change the logo to the royal crown and mailed fist of RMC.

Some of the sports teams, namely the Hockey team and the Rugby team, still continue to call themselves 'Redmen' in unofficial forums. Although the uniforms now say Paladins, those teams have never accepted the name change and keep up the old tradition.

In 2001, the RMC cut their interuniversity programs from 30 down to 11.  In 2002, the commandant of the college, R.Adm. Morse, made the decision to scale back the varsity sports program. This was done with the stated goal of increasing the competitiveness of the remaining sports by consolidating the skilled athletes. Also stated was a desire to encourage teamwork and leadership that would be necessary for cadets once they left the college. This move was unpopular within the student body of the college, and amongst ex-Cadets, as it left students who were very competitive in a sport of their choice without a means to participate. Among the teams cut were Men's and Women's rugby union, track and field, swimming, rowing, biathlon and karate; while the college kept the hockey, soccer, volleyball, basketball, taekwondo and fencing teams. In 2004, after lobbying by RMC alumni and support from the student body, the college brought back the Men's Rugby team at the Varsity level.

In 2007, the RMC Running Team started once again to compete at the OUA / CIS level.

West Point Weekend 

The West Point series originated when the commandant of RMC, Sir Archibald McDonnell and the superintendent of the United States Military Academy (West Point), Brigadier General Douglas MacArthur, suggested a game of hockey between the two schools in 1921. After two years of exchanging ideas the first game was played on February 23, 1923 at West Point.
The Redmen won that first game 3–0 and a New York paper stated "Army was beaten at hockey 
today by Royal Military College of Kingston, Ontario. The Canadian cadets excelled the Army 
men all the way, displaying the best all-around form seen here in years. Hamilton and the Carr-
Harris's were the outstanding stars of the Canadian team. This game was one of the cleanest-fought contests staged here this winter and was marked by a fine display of sportsmanship on both sides." In commemoration of the game, RMC donated the "Challenge Trophy".

In 1924, the series moved to Kingston thus beginning the tradition of rotating venues. This was Army's first away game and up until 1941 the West Point Game was the only time that Army played away from the Academy.

From 1923–1935 RMC ran up a record of 14–0–1. The only blemish being a 4–4 tie in 1935. 1939 saw Army win its first game 3–1. As a result of WWII only one game was played over the next ten years, a 3–1 Army win in 1942.

In the 1950s and 1960s, Army won 15 of 20 games bringing the series close with RMC holding a 
21–18–1 advantage. Throughout the 1970s and 1980s, the teams played fairly closely. In 1986, the
record stood at 26–25–4 in favour of RMC.

Army dominated over the next 15 years, going unbeaten from 1988–1999. RMC last won in 
2002 by a score of 3–0 and Army won in 2004, 3–2.

The 2003 game featured a 4–0 Army win at West Point. RMC was shut-out for the first time 
since 1996 while being short-handed 12 times during the game.

The 2006 game was a 3–3 tie in front of 3100 fans in Kingston. Currently Army leads the Series 39–29–7.

The 2007 edition of the rivalry was to take place on Saturday 10 Feb, at Tate Arena in West Point, New York, but was cancelled due to regular season scheduling conflicts.  For 2008, the teams did not play a competitive game but instead the Paladins will travel to New York to spend 3 days practicing, playing and socializing with the West Point cadets.

The game was not played from 2007-2010, nor in 2012, but has been held annually since.  The most recent edition in 2020 saw RMC defeat West Point 3-2 in overtime, RMC's first win in the series since 2002.

This series was first conceived in 1923.

Historic Hockey Series

The Canadian Amateur Hockey Association recognizes a claim that Kingston, Ontario is the birthplace of ice hockey from a game played between Queen's University and the Royal Military College of Canada in 1886. This game is memorialized by the International Hockey Hall of Fame annual Historic Hockey Series. The Queen's vs. RMC rivalry dates back to 1886 and is the longest in hockey history. Since that time the rivalry has continued to grow with fans travelling to the cross-town rival RMC.

Royal Military College formerly competed in the intermediate division of the Ontario Hockey Association, and won the J. Ross Robertson Cup during the 1930–31 season.

Wing Harrier Race and sports day
The annual Wing Harrier Race and sports day is held in the fall. During the traditional Wing Harrier race, a 5 kilometre run around the peninsula, cadets are allowed to wear colourful costumes to support the squadrons. The day includes various activities such as tabloids, the maze challenge, Flag football, tug-of-war and the chain of command relay race. The day finishes off with the award ceremony.

Sandhurst Competition

The college won the competition in 2005, 2006 and 2007. Following defeat by the Sandhurst Academy team in 2008, RMC won the Sandhurst Competition again in 2009. The military skills competition included an equipment inspection, boat movement, marksmanship, grenade throwing, first aid, river crossing, wall obstacle, and radio communications.

Physical performance

RMC students must also complete the RMC Physical Performance Test three times each year. The test consists of five components, which are scored separately, and the total is summed together for a final score with a maximum of 500 points.

Student athletes
In the 2006–07 school year, 15 RMC student-athletes earned Academic All-Canadian status under CIS guidelines while another 5 fencers earned the equivalent OUA achievement.

Proficiency badges

The gold thread crossed pistols are awarded as a military badge for marksmanship when markman levels are achieved for the pistol; a crown is awarded in May to the top score in the College. The gold thread crossed rifles are awarded as a military badge for marksmanship when markman levels are achieved for the rifle; a crown is awarded in May to the top score in the College. The gold thread cross swords in a laurel wreath military proficiency badge is awarded if the following conditions have been met by the student: a mark of at least B in military assessment; positive leadership qualities in the summer training report; an academic average of at least 70%; a mark of at least B in physical training; a satisfactory mark in the bilingualism profile; A crown is awarded to the top Cadet having received this award, by year. All students are awarded at least a blue start for a start at bilingualism. As they achieve proficiency, they receive a silver or gold star. An academic distinction badge is awarded to a student with an academic average of at least 80% at the end of the year. Physical fitness badges are awarded upon reaching a certain number of points. As cadets learn and demonstrate leadership skills, they are appointed to different positions. The number of bars increases from 0 to 5 as students are promoted.

Awards
Awards are granted to outstanding cadets:

Other Articles 

RMC Hockey History Digest, Eds. S125 Major (Ret) William WJ Oliver and S134 Mrs Rolande Oliver, Red & White Books, Kingston, 2003

See also 
List of Royal Military College of Canada people
U Sports.

References 

Award descriptions and lists of past recipients of the HRH Prince of Wales Cup, the Tommy Smart Cup, and the Kelly Gawne Memorial Cup
Royal Military College Paladins & mascots

External links 

 Royal Military College of Canada athletics
 Unofficial RMC Paladins Varsity Hockey Program

U Sports teams
Sport in Kingston, Ontario
Royal Military College of Canada
Military sport in Canada